DekaBank was formed as a first private bank in Azerbaijan in 1989. Until the collapse of the USSR it served as a cooperative bank, whereas the Central Bank of Azerbaijan issued a license in 1992 which granted rights to the bank to offer all kinds of commercial banking services.

See also

 Banking in Azerbaijan
 Central Bank of Azerbaijan
 List of banks in Azerbaijan
 Azerbaijani manat
 Economy of Azerbaijan

References

External links
DekaBank web page

Government of Azerbaijan
Economy of Azerbaijan
Banks of Azerbaijan
Banks established in 1989
1989 establishments in Azerbaijan